FabricLive.69 is a 2013 DJ mix album by Fake Blood. The album was released as part of the FabricLive Mix Series.

Track list

References

External links
FabricLive 69 at Allmusic
FabricLive.69 at Fabric

Fabric (club) albums
2013 compilation albums